The discography of LeVert, an American contemporary R&B group, consists of seven studio albums and twenty-three singles. Four of their albums (The Big Throwdown, Just Coolin', Rope a Dope Style and For Real Tho') have been certified gold by the RIAA. The group's only pop hit in the United States was "Casanova", which peaked at #5 on the Billboard Hot 100 in 1987.

Albums

Studio albums

Compilation albums
The Best of LeVert (2001, Rhino)
Just Coolin' and Other Hits (2004, Rhino)

Singles

As featured artist

Music videos

References

Discographies of American artists
Rhythm and blues discographies
Soul music discographies